Cymbovula acicularis is a species of sea snail, a marine gastropod mollusk in the family Ovulidae, the ovulids, cowry allies or false cowries.

Distribution
This marine species occurs in the Caribbean Sea off Guadeloupe.

Description 
The maximum recorded shell length is 17 mm.

Habitat 
Minimum recorded depth is 0.3 m. Maximum recorded depth is 60 m.

References

 Lorenz F. & Fehse D. (2009) The living Ovulidae. A manual of the families of allied cowries: Ovulidae, Pediculariidae and Eocypraeidae. Hackenheim: Conchbooks.
 Rios, E.C. (1994) Seashells of Brazil. 2nd Edition. Fundaçao Cidade do Rio Grande, Fundaçao Universidade do Rio Grande, Museu Oceanográphico, Rio Grande, RS, XII, Rio Grande, Brazil, 368 pp., 113 pls.

External links
 Lamarck, J.B.M.de. (1811). [Suite de la détermination des espèces de Mollusques testacés.] Continuation du genre Porcelaine, et genre Ovule. (Ovula.). Annales du Muséum d'Histoire Naturelle. 16: 109–114
 Cate, C. N. 1973. A systematic revision of the recent Cypraeid family Ovulidae. Veliger 15 (supplement): 1–117
 Rosenberg, G.; Moretzsohn, F.; García, E. F. (2009). Gastropoda (Mollusca) of the Gulf of Mexico, Pp. 579–699 in: Felder, D.L. and D.K. Camp (eds.), Gulf of Mexico–Origins, Waters, and Biota. Texas A&M Press, College Station, Texas
 Reijnen B.T., Hoeksema B.W. & Gittenberger E. (2010) Host specificity and phylogenetic relationships among Atlantic Ovulidae (Mollusca: Gastropoda). Contributions to Zoology 79(2): 69–78

Ovulidae
Taxa named by Jean-Baptiste Lamarck
Gastropods described in 1810